The 2022–23 Primera Divisió was the 28th season of top-tier football in Andorra. The season began on 11 September 2022. The league champion qualified to compete in the 2022–23 UEFA Champions League.

Participating teams

Standings

League table

Results

Fixtures and results
The eight clubs played each other four times for a total of twenty-eight matches season.

Statistics

Top scorers

References

External links
   

Primera Divisió seasons
Andorra
Primera Divisio